Al Salam Sporting Club, is an Egyptian football club based in Esna. The club currently plays in the Egyptian Second Division.

Egyptian Second Division
Football clubs in Egypt